The 1988–89 season was the 19th season of the Portland Trail Blazers in the National Basketball Association (NBA). The team was racked with dissension and posted a 25–22 record before head coach Mike Schuler was fired in mid-February; assistant coach Rick Adelman was promoted to replace him on an interim basis. After the Blazers reached the 1989 NBA Playoffs, Adelman was made the head coach on a full-time basis. At midseason, the team traded Kiki Vandeweghe to the New York Knicks. After holding a 25–21 record at the All-Star break, the Blazers played below .500 for the remainder of the season, and finished fifth in the Pacific Division with a 39–43 record, eighth in the Western Conference, qualifying for the playoffs for the seventh consecutive year.

Clyde Drexler averaged 27.2 points, 7.9 rebounds, 5.8 assists and 2.7 steals per game, while last season's Most Improved Player Kevin Duckworth averaged 18.1 points and 8.0 rebounds per game, and Terry Porter provided the team with 17.7 points, 9.5 assists and 1.8 steals per game. In addition, Jerome Kersey contributed 17.5 points, 8.3 rebounds and 1.8 steals per game, while Steve Johnson provided with 10.0 points and 5.0 rebounds per game off the bench, and Sam Bowie averaged 8.6 points and 5.3 rebounds per game also off the bench, in only just 20 games due to injury. Drexler and Duckworth were both selected for the 1989 NBA All-Star Game.

In the 1989 NBA Playoffs, the Blazers were eliminated in the first round of the playoffs for the fourth straight year, losing three straight to the eventual Western Conference champion Los Angeles Lakers. The Lakers would reach the NBA Finals for the third consecutive year, but would lose to the Detroit Pistons in four straight games.

Following the season, the oft-injured Bowie was traded to the New Jersey Nets, and Johnson left in the 1989 NBA Expansion Draft.

Draft picks

Roster

Regular season

Season standings

z - clinched division title
y - clinched division title
x - clinched playoff spot

Record vs. opponents

Game log

Regular season

|- align="center" bgcolor="#ccffcc"
| 1
| November 4
| Phoenix
| W 120–105
|
|
|
| Memorial Coliseum
| 1–0
|- align="center" bgcolor="#ccffcc"
| 2
| November 5
| Sacramento
| W 121–103
|
|
|
| Memorial Coliseum
| 2–0
|- align="center" bgcolor="#ffcccc"
| 3
| November 10
| @ Denver
| L 115–135
|
|
|
| McNichols Sports Arena
| 2–1
|- align="center" bgcolor="#ffcccc"
| 4
| November 12
| @ Golden State
| L 100–107
|
|
|
| Oakland–Alameda County Coliseum Arena
| 2–2
|- align="center" bgcolor="#ffcccc"
| 5
| November 13
| Denver
| L 132–143
|
|
|
| Memorial Coliseum
| 2–3
|- align="center" bgcolor="#ccffcc"
| 6
| November 15
| L.A. Clippers
| W 125–103
|
|
|
| Memorial Coliseum
| 3–3
|- align="center" bgcolor="#ffcccc"
| 7
| November 17
| @ Utah
| L 99–123
|
|
|
| Salt Palace
| 3–4
|- align="center" bgcolor="#ffcccc"
| 8
| November 18
| @ L.A. Lakers
| L 105–106
|
|
|
| The Forum
| 3–5
|- align="center" bgcolor="#ccffcc"
| 9
| November 20
| New Jersey
| W 117–106
|
|
|
| Memorial Coliseum
| 4–5
|- align="center" bgcolor="#ccffcc"
| 10
| November 22
| @ Seattle
| W 125–104
|
|
|
| Seattle Center Coliseum
| 5–5
|- align="center" bgcolor="#ccffcc"
| 11
| November 25
| Houston
| W 111–94
|
|
|
| Memorial Coliseum
| 6–5
|- align="center" bgcolor="#ccffcc"
| 12
| November 27
| Golden State
| W 109–94
|
|
|
| Memorial Coliseum
| 7–5
|- align="center" bgcolor="#ffcccc"
| 13
| November 29
| @ Milwaukee
| L 114–119
|
|
|
| Bradley Center
| 7–6
|- align="center" bgcolor="#ffcccc"
| 14
| November 30
| @ Philadelphia
| L 106–114
|
|
|
| The Spectrum
| 7–7

|- align="center" bgcolor="#ccffcc"
| 15
| December 2
| @ Miami
| W 105–102
|
|
|
| Miami Arena
| 8–7
|- align="center" bgcolor="#ffcccc"
| 16
| December 3
| @ Atlanta
| L 97–115
|
|
|
| The Omni
| 8–8
|- align="center" bgcolor="#ccffcc"
| 17
| December 6
| @ New Jersey
| W 97–93
|
|
|
| Brendan Byrne Arena
| 9–8
|- align="center" bgcolor="#ffcccc"
| 18
| December 7
| @ Indiana
| L 120–129
|
|
|
| Market Square Arena
| 9–9
|- align="center" bgcolor="#ccffcc"
| 19
| December 9
| Washington
| W 93–90
|
|
|
| Memorial Coliseum
| 10–9
|- align="center" bgcolor="#ccffcc"
| 20
| December 11
| San Antonio
| W 128–123 (OT)
|
|
|
| Memorial Coliseum
| 11–9
|- align="center" bgcolor="#ccffcc"
| 21
| December 13
| L.A. Clippers
| W 113–92
|
|
|
| Memorial Coliseum
| 12–9
|- align="center" bgcolor="#ffcccc"
| 22
| December 16
| @ Phoenix
| L 125–132
|
|
|
| Arizona Veterans Memorial Coliseum
| 12–10
|- align="center" bgcolor="#ccffcc"
| 23
| December 17
| Phoenix
| W 115–97
|
|
|
| Memorial Coliseum
| 13–10
|- align="center" bgcolor="#ccffcc"
| 24
| December 20
| @ Denver
| W 127–124
|
|
|
| McNichols Sports Arena
| 14–10
|- align="center" bgcolor="#ccffcc"
| 25
| December 22
| @ Golden State
| W 117–109
|
|
|
| Oakland–Alameda County Coliseum Arena
| 15–10
|- align="center" bgcolor="#ccffcc"
| 26
| December 23
| Golden State
| W 111–107
|
|
|
| Memorial Coliseum
| 16–10
|- align="center" bgcolor="#ffcccc"
| 27
| December 27
| @ Sacramento
| L 111–112
|
|
|
| ARCO Arena
| 16–11

|- align="center" bgcolor="#ccffcc"
| 28
| January 3
| Miami
| W 119–95
|
|
|
| Memorial Coliseum
| 17–11
|- align="center" bgcolor="#ffcccc"
| 29
| January 4
| @ L.A. Lakers
| L 120–133
|
|
|
| Great Western Forum
| 17–12
|- align="center" bgcolor="#ccffcc"
| 30
| January 6
| Sacramento
| W 147–142 (2OT)
|
|
|
| Memorial Coliseum
| 18–12
|- align="center" bgcolor="#ffcccc"
| 31
| January 7
| @ Seattle
| L 123–129
|
|
|
| Seattle Center Coliseum
| 18–13
|- align="center" bgcolor="#ccffcc"
| 32
| January 10
| Seattle
| W 125–109
|
|
|
| Memorial Coliseum
| 19–13
|- align="center" bgcolor="#ffcccc"
| 33
| January 12
| @ Houston
| L 106–116
|
|
|
| The Summit
| 19–14
|- align="center" bgcolor="#ccffcc"
| 34
| January 14
| @ San Antonio
| W 103–99
|
|
|
| HemisFair Arena
| 20–14
|- align="center" bgcolor="#ffcccc"
| 35
| January 15
| @ Dallas
| L 108–111
|
|
|
| Reunion Arena
| 20–15
|- align="center" bgcolor="#ffcccc"
| 36
| January 17
| Utah
| L 110–111
|
|
|
| Memorial Coliseum
| 20–16
|- align="center" bgcolor="#ffcccc"
| 37
| January 22
| New York
| L 116–120
|
|
|
| Memorial Coliseum
| 20–17
|- align="center" bgcolor="#ffcccc"
| 38
| January 24
| Seattle
| L 100–103
|
|
|
| Memorial Coliseum
| 20–18
|- align="center" bgcolor="#ffcccc"
| 39
| January 26
| Milwaukee
| L 109–127
|
|
|
| Memorial Coliseum
| 20–19
|- align="center" bgcolor="#ccffcc"
| 40
| January 28
| Atlanta
| W 110–94
|
|
|
| Memorial Coliseum
| 21–19
|- align="center" bgcolor="#ccffcc"
| 41
| January 30
| Charlotte
| W 130–118
|
|
|
| Memorial Coliseum
| 22–19

|- align="center" bgcolor="#ccffcc"
| 42
| February 1
| @ L.A. Clippers
| W 108–107
|
|
|
| Los Angeles Memorial Sports Arena
| 23–19
|- align="center" bgcolor="#ffcccc"
| 43
| February 3
| @ L.A. Lakers
| L 129–140
|
|
|
| Great Western Forum
| 23–20
|- align="center" bgcolor="#ccffcc"
| 44
| February 4
| San Antonio
| W 137–100
|
|
|
| Memorial Coliseum
| 24–20
|- align="center" bgcolor="#ccffcc"
| 45
| February 7
| Dallas
| W 134–125
|
|
|
| Memorial Coliseum
| 25–20
|- align="center" bgcolor="#ffcccc"
| 46
| February 9
| Houston
| L 110–113
|
|
|
| Memorial Coliseum
| 25–21
|- align="center" bgcolor="#ffcccc"
| 47
| February 16
| L.A. Lakers
| L 101–110
|
|
|
| Memorial Coliseum
| 25–22
|- align="center" bgcolor="#ffcccc"
| 48
| February 18
| Seattle
| L 115–116
|
|
|
| Memorial Coliseum
| 25–23
|- align="center" bgcolor="#ffcccc"
| 49
| February 20
| @ Chicago
| L 98–102
|
|
|
| Chicago Stadium
| 25–24
|- align="center" bgcolor="#ffcccc"
| 50
| February 22
| @ Detroit
| L 94–105
|
|
|
| The Palace of Auburn Hills
| 25–25
|- align="center" bgcolor="#ffcccc"
| 51
| February 24
| @ Cleveland
| L 91–128
|
|
|
| Richfield Coliseum
| 25–26
|- align="center" bgcolor="#ccffcc"
| 52
| February 26
| @ Miami
| W 124–102
|
|
|
| Miami Arena
| 26–26
|- align="center" bgcolor="#ccffcc"
| 53
| February 28
| Phoenix
| W 139–134
|
|
|
| Memorial Coliseum
| 27–26

|- align="center" bgcolor="#ccffcc"
| 54
| March 2
| @ L.A. Clippers
| W 119–113
|
|
|
| Los Angeles Memorial Sports Arena
| 28–26
|- align="center" bgcolor="#ccffcc"
| 55
| March 3
| Philadelphia
| W 129–121
|
|
|
| Memorial Coliseum
| 29–26
|- align="center" bgcolor="#ffcccc"
| 56
| March 5
| Indiana
| L 118–121 (OT)
|
|
|
| Memorial Coliseum
| 29–27
|- align="center" bgcolor="#ccffcc"
| 57
| March 7
| @ San Antonio
| W 116–103
|
|
|
| HemisFair Arena
| 30–27
|- align="center" bgcolor="#ffcccc"
| 58
| March 8
| @ Dallas
| L 92–99
|
|
|
| Reunion Arena
| 31–27
|- align="center" bgcolor="#ffcccc"
| 59
| March 12
| Cleveland
| L 110–122
|
|
|
| Memorial Coliseum
| 31–28
|- align="center" bgcolor="#ccffcc"
| 60
| March 14
| Golden State
| W 139–110
|
|
|
| Memorial Coliseum
| 31–29
|- align="center" bgcolor="#ffcccc"
| 61
| March 15
| @ Utah
| L 95–102
|
|
|
| Salt Palace
| 31–30
|- align="center" bgcolor="#ffcccc"
| 62
| March 17
| @ Phoenix
| L 124–129
|
|
|
| Arizona Veterans Memorial Coliseum
| 31–31
|- align="center" bgcolor="#ffcccc"
| 63
| March 18
| @ Houston
| L 113–127
|
|
|
| The Summit
| 31–32
|- align="center" bgcolor="#ccffcc"
| 64
| March 20
| Dallas
| W 112–91
|
|
|
| Memorial Coliseum
| 32–32
|- align="center" bgcolor="#ffcccc"
| 65
| March 21
| @ Golden State
| L 127–151
|
|
|
| Oakland–Alameda County Coliseum Arena
| 32–33
|- align="center" bgcolor="#ffcccc"
| 66
| March 24
| Chicago
| L 113–128
|
|
|
| Memorial Coliseum
| 32–34
|- align="center" bgcolor="#ffcccc"
| 67
| March 25
| @ Sacramento
| L 105–106
|
|
|
| ARCO Arena
| 32–35
|- align="center" bgcolor="#ffcccc"
| 68
| March 28
| @ New York
| L 124–128
|
|
|
| Madison Square Garden
| 32–36
|- align="center" bgcolor="#ffcccc"
| 69
| March 29
| @ Boston
| L 97–106
|
|
|
| Boston Garden
| 32–37
|- align="center" bgcolor="#ffcccc"
| 70
| March 31
| @ Washington
| L 105–107
|
|
|
| Capital Centre
| 32–38

|- align="center" bgcolor="#ccffcc"
| 71
| April 1
| @ Charlotte
| W 125–121 (OT)
|
|
|
| Charlotte Coliseum
| 33–38
|- align="center" bgcolor="#ccffcc"
| 72
| April 4
| Detroit
| W 118–100
|
|
|
| Memorial Coliseum
| 34–38
|- align="center" bgcolor="#ffcccc"
| 73
| April 6
| @ L.A. Clippers
| L 123–133
|
|
|
| Los Angeles Memorial Sports Arena
| 34–39
|- align="center" bgcolor="#ccffcc"
| 74
| April 7
| Boston
| W 113–100
|
|
|
| Memorial Coliseum
| 35–39
|- align="center" bgcolor="#ccffcc"
| 75
| April 9
| Denver
| W 120–114
|
|
|
| Memorial Coliseum
| 36–39
|- align="center" bgcolor="#ccffcc"
| 76
| April 11
| L.A. Clippers
| W 126–102
|
|
|
| Memorial Coliseum
| 37–39
|- align="center" bgcolor="#ccffcc"
| 77
| April 14
| Miami
| W 97–86
|
|
|
| Memorial Coliseum
| 38–39
|- align="center" bgcolor="#ffcccc"
| 78
| April 15
| Utah
| L 95–99
|
|
|
| Memorial Coliseum
| 38–40
|- align="center" bgcolor="#ffcccc"
| 79
| April 18
| @ Sacramento
| L 118–120
|
|
|
| ARCO Arena
| 38–41
|- align="center" bgcolor="#ffcccc"
| 80
| April 20
| @ Seattle
| L 118–124
|
|
|
| Seattle Center Coliseum
| 38–42
|- align="center" bgcolor="#ffcccc"
| 81
| April 21
| L.A. Lakers
| L 114–121
|
|
|
| Memorial Coliseum
| 38–43
|- align="center" bgcolor="#ccffcc"
| 82
| April 23
| Sacramento
| W 126–120 (OT)
|
|
|
| Memorial Coliseum
| 39–43

Playoffs

|-
|- align="center" bgcolor="#ffcccc"
| 1
| April 27
| @ L.A. Lakers
| L 108–128
| Clyde Drexler (30)
| Kersey, Porter (9)
| Terry Porter (10)
| Great Western Forum17,505
| 0–1
|- align="center" bgcolor="#ffcccc"
| 2
| April 30
| @ L.A. Lakers
| L 105–113
| Clyde Drexler (28)
| Jerome Kersey (11)
| Clyde Drexler (10)
| Great Western Forum17,505
| 0–2
|- align="center" bgcolor="#ffcccc"
| 3
| May 3
| L.A. Lakers
| L 108–116
| Terry Porter (29)
| Clyde Drexler (8)
| Terry Porter (9)
| Memorial Coliseum12,880
| 0–3
|-

Player statistics

Season

Playoffs

Awards and honors
 Clyde Drexler, NBA All-Star
 Kevin Duckworth, NBA All-Star

Transactions

References

Portland Trail Blazers seasons
Portland Trail Blazers 1988
Portland Trail Blazers 1988
Port
Portland
Portland